The Cyprus national football team represents Cyprus in international football and is controlled by the Cyprus Football Association, the governing body for football in Cyprus. Cyprus' home ground is the GSP Stadium in Nicosia and the current coach is Temur Ketsbaia.

History
The team's first match took place on 23 July 1949, one year after becoming a member of the world governing body FIFA: a friendly against Maccabi Tel Aviv in Tel Aviv, ending in a 3–3 draw. Seven days later, the team had its first international game: a 3–1 defeat by Israel in the same city.

In November 1960, following independence from British rule, Cyprus drew its first post-independence official match 1–1 against Israel, as part of the 1962 FIFA World Cup qualifying tournament. Cyprus' first international victory was a 3–1 win over Greece on 27 November 1963 in a friendly. On 17 February 1968, Cyprus recorded their first competitive win, beating Switzerland 2–1 in a European Championship qualifying match in Old GSP Stadium in Nicosia.

In 1974, the national team enjoyed one of their most famous victories when they beat Northern Ireland 1–0 in Nicosia.  On 12 February 1983, as part of the Euro 1984 qualifiers, Cyprus held world champions Italy to a 1–1 draw in Tsirio Stadium in Limassol, followed a month later by the same result against Czechoslovakia. Four years later, in the Euro 1988 qualification, Cyprus recorded their first ever point achieved in an away match, against Poland. In 1989 they drew 1–1 with France in the World Cup qualifying match. Despite a number of triumphs on home soil, Cyprus had to wait until 1992 to record their first away win: a 2–0 victory against the Faroe Islands.

Results in qualifying tournaments have also improved considerably in recent times. In the qualifying stages for the 1996 UEFA European Championship, Cyprus drew 1–1 with holders Denmark. Four years later, they missed out on a place in the UEFA Euro 2000 despite 3–2 victories against both Spain and Israel and a 4–0 win over San Marino.

On 15 November 2000, Cyprus scored their biggest win in history by beating Andorra in Limassol 5–0 in the 2002 FIFA World Cup qualification. On 7 October 2006, as part of the Euro 2008 qualifiers, Cyprus caused a major upset by beating the Republic of Ireland 5–2 at GSP Stadium in Nicosia, with Michalis Konstantinou and Constantinos Charalambidis each scoring two goals and Alexandros Garpozis finishing off the match. Just one month later, on 15 November 2006, they caused another surprise by holding the previous World Cup's hosts Germany to a 1–1 draw at home. On 13 October 2007, they beat Wales 3–1 in Nicosia. On 17 October 2007, Cyprus came close to a historic away victory in Dublin against the Republic of Ireland, but the hosts equalised in the last minute of the game and the match ended 1–1. On 3 September 2010, as part of the Euro 2012 qualifiers, Cyprus claimed a historic 4–4 draw against Portugal in Guimarães.

During the Euro 2016 qualification phase, Cyprus, managed by Pambos Christodoulou, claimed one of their most historic victories by defeating 2014 World Cup participant Bosnia 2–1 in Zenica. In the last group match, the team faced Bosnia, needing a victory to finish 3rd and rely on Belgium to beat Israel in Brussels. As fate would have it, the Bosnians won the reverse leg 3–2 and qualified to the play-offs at the expense of the home team, who at one point took a 2–1 lead during the first half and for a number of minutes held onto 3rd place and a berth in the play-offs for the first time in history, as Belgium, a soon to be world number 1 side, were comfortably beating Israel at home.

Cyprus would finish behind Estonia and ahead of Gibraltar to place 5th of 6 teams in Group H in the 2018 FIFA World Cup qualifiers. Their qualification run would include an impressive 3–2 home victory over Bosnia.

In the Euro 2020 qualifiers, Cyprus beat San Marino 5-0 but they lost to Belgium and Scotland. Even though they beat Kazakhstan 1–2 away from home, they lost their last three games and finished 4th out of 6 teams in the group, just ahead of Kazakhstan and San Marino.

The 2020–21 UEFA Nations League was a big disappointment for Cyprus. They lost their first three games against Montenegro 0–2, Azerbaijan 0–1 and Luxembourg 2–0 and drew with Azerbaijan 0–0 in the fourth game. Even though they beat Luxembourg 2–1 at home, they were crushed 4–0 by Montenegro in their last game and finished last in their group. This meant that they had to face Estonia in the relegation play-offs. They defeated Estonia 2–0 on aggregate, with goals from Marinos Tzionis and Pieros Sotiriou.

Kit
On 7 October 2006, Diadora unveiled Cyprus' new kit. It outlines a map of Cyprus in amber from the shoulder to the sleeve, with a green line running down the middle to indicate the division of the island. This controversial kit was used for the UEFA Euro 2008 qualifying phase. Then, Adidas made Cyprus' kits for the 2010 FIFA World Cup qualification, the UEFA Euro 2012 qualifying and the 2014 FIFA World Cup qualification phases. In 2018, Macron replaced Adidas as part of UEFA's Kit Assistance Scheme.

Home stadium
Cyprus currently play their home matches at the GSP Stadium in Nicosia or the AEK Arena in Larnaca. Home matches had previously been staged at different stadiums all around the country. Until 1974, Cyprus used either the old GSP Stadium in central Nicosia or the GSE Stadium in Famagusta. After the Turkish invasion of Cyprus, some matches were played at the Tsirion Stadium in Limassol and the Makario Stadium in Nicosia. In 1999, the building of the New GSP Stadium in Nicosia provided a new home for the national team but in 2008, a change of sponsorship forced home fixtures of the 2010 FIFA World Cup qualification phase to be played at the Antonis Papadopoulos Stadium in Larnaca. However, Cyprus returned to the GSP Stadium for the UEFA Euro 2012 qualifying phase.

Recent results and forthcoming fixtures

2022

2023

Coaching staff

Coaching history
.

  Argyrios Gavalas (1960–1967)
  Pambos Avraamidis (1968–1969)
  Ray Wood (1970–1971)
  Sima Milovanov (1972)
  Pambos Avraamidis (1972–1974)
  Panikos Iakovou (1974)
  Pambos Avraamidis (1975)
  Kostas Talianos (1976)
  Panikos Krystallis (1976–1977)
  Andreas Lazarides (1977)
  Kostas Talianos (1978–1982)
  Vasil Spasov (1982–1984)
  Panikos Iakovou (1984–1987)
  Takis Charalambous (1987)
  Panikos Iakovou (1988–1991)
  Andreas Michaelides (1991–1996)
  Stavros Papadopoulos (1997)
  Panikos Georgiou (1997–1999)
  Stavros Papadopoulos (1999–2001)
  Takis Charalambous (2001)
  Momčilo Vukotić (2001–2004)
  Angelos Anastasiadis (2005–2011)
  Nikos Nioplias (2011–2013)
  Pambos Christodoulou (2014–2015)
  Christakis Christoforou (2015–2017)
  Ran Ben Shimon (2017–2020)
  Johan Walem (2020–2021)
  Nikos Kostenoglou (2021–2022)
  Temur Ketsbaia (2022–)

Players

Current squad
The following players were called for the UEFA Euro 2024 qualifying match against Scotland on 25 March 2023 and the friendly match against Armenia on 28 March 2023.

Caps and goals correct as of  20 November 2022, after the match against Israel.

Recent call-ups
The following players have also been called up to the Cyprus squad within the last 12 months and are still available for selection.

INJ Player withdrew from the squad due to an injury.
PRE Preliminary squad.
RET Retired from international football.
SUS Suspended

Player records

Players in bold are still active with Cyprus.

Most capped players

Top goalscorers

Competitive record

All-time record
.

FIFA World Cup record

UEFA European Championship record

UEFA Nations League record

Head-to-head record
As of 20 November 2022.

References
Notes

Citation

External links

 Official Site
 RSSSF archive of results 1949–
 RSSSF archive of most capped players and highest goalscorers
 RSSSF archive of coaches 1929–

1949 establishments in Cyprus
 
European national association football teams
Football in Cyprus